The Australian Welsh Male Choir is a Welsh male voice choir from Frankston in Melbourne, Victoria, Australia.

History

Originally known as the Frankston Welsh Male Choir its first performance was the dedication of the chapel at the Victoria Police Academy on 20 October 1974, which was broadcast on television by the Australian Broadcasting Corporation. In 1980, it changed its name to the Victoria Welsh Male Choir.

In 1984, it toured the United Kingdom and became the first choir outside of Wales to sing as part of the 1000 Voice Festival of Male Choirs at the Royal Albert Hall in London. It was invited to join the Welsh Association Of Male Choirs during this tour, becoming the first choir outside Wales to be offered such membership, and remains its only Australian member. Upon returning to Australia, in 1985, it changed its name to the Australian Welsh Male Choir.

The choir was invited to sing again at the 1000 Voice Festival in 1988. At the festival, in celebration of the Australian bicentenary year, it gave a solo performance of “I Still Call Australia Home” by Peter Allen. To date, it remains the only choir to have performed solo at the festival.

Discography

Patrons
 Sidney Baillieu Myer AC
 Tammy Fraser AO
 Haydn James

References

External links
 

Culture of Melbourne
Musical groups from Melbourne
Victoria (Australia) musical groups
Australian choirs
1974 establishments in Australia
Musical groups established in 1974
Welsh-language music
Frankston, Victoria
British-Australian culture